Alder Island may refer to:
Canada
Alder Island (New Brunswick), an island in Charlotte County, New Brunswick, Canada
Alder Island (Haida Gwaii), an island in the Haida Gwaii archipelago of the North Coast of British Columbia, Canada, Nprth of Burnaby Island, off the southeast end of Moresby Island. Also called Ḵ'uuna Gwaayaay
Alder Island (Carp Lake), an island in the area of Carp Lake Provincial Park and Protected Area, southwest of McLeod Lake
Alder Island (British Columbia), an island in the Carey Group islands in the Queen Charlotte Strait-Johnstone Strait region of the Central Coast of British Columbia
Alder Island Stillwater is a river feature in Halifax County, Nova Scotia
United States
Alder Island (New York), an island in Nassau County, New York

See also
 Fogo, Newfoundland and Labrador